Victoria Aihar (Montevideo, 19 April 1978), is a Uruguayan web designer, programmer and author.

She studied at Crandon Institute, and also studied English, French and Arabic. She graduated as a Web designer in 2001, and she is currently working as a programmer and a writer. She got married in 2000. She published her erotic novels under a pseudonym. Her books have been edited and published by Editorial Planeta in countries like Spain. The book «"Un café no se le niega a nadie"» during its presale has reached the 7th place among the bestseller ranking by Amazon Spain, even above the bestseller and sequel to "Fifty Shades of Grey" by Erika James.

Books 
2014, Una canción para Abril
2014, ¿A cuántos centímetros de ti?
2015, Una segunda oportunidad
2015, Un café no se le niega a nadie

References

External links 

Entrevista a la autora Victoria Aiha, 2014.

1978 births
Writers from Montevideo
Living people
Women erotica writers
20th-century Uruguayan women writers
20th-century Uruguayan writers
21st-century Uruguayan women writers
21st-century Uruguayan writers
People educated at the Crandon Institute